Koen Fossey (born 30 June 1953) is a Belgian illustrator.

Career 

He won the Prijs van de Vlaamse Provincies in 1983 for his picture book Het spoortje in het bos.

Fossey received the Prijs van de Kinder- en Jeugdjury voor het boek in Vlaanderen several times for illustrating various books written by Ed Franck: in 1986 for the book Spetters op de kermis,  in 1987 for Tenten in de wei, in 1989 for De witte muur and in 1990 for Wie wil Wubbe weg.

In 1989, he won the very first Boekenpauw award for illustrating the book Moet je echt weg, also written by Ed Franck.

Awards 
 1983: Prijs van de Vlaamse Provincies, Het spoortje in het bos
 1986: Prijs van de Kinder- en Jeugdjury voor het boek in Vlaanderen, Spetters op de kermis
 1987: Prijs van de Kinder- en Jeugdjury voor het boek in Vlaanderen, Tenten in de wei
 1989: Prijs van de Kinder- en Jeugdjury voor het boek in Vlaanderen, De witte muur
 1989: Boekenpauw, Moet je echt weg
 1990: Prijs van de Kinder- en Jeugdjury voor het boek in Vlaanderen, Wie wil Wubbe weg?

References

External links 
 Koen Fossey (in Dutch), Digital Library for Dutch Literature
 Koen Fossey (in Dutch), jeugdliteratuur.org

1953 births
Living people
Boekenpauw winners
Belgian children's book illustrators